Casasia samuelssonii is a plant belonging to the family Rubiaceae. It is found in the Dominican Republic.

References

samuelssonii